The White Raven is a  1917 American silent drama film produced by B. A. Rolfe's Rolfe Photoplays and distributed by Metro Pictures. This drama stars Ethel Barrymore in an original screen story.

A copy of the film is preserved at George Eastman House.

Cast
Ethel Barrymore - Nan Baldwin
William B. Davidson - The Stranger
Walter Hitchcock - John Blaisdell
George A. Wright - Arthur Smithson
Viola A. Fortescue - Mrs. Smithson
Herbert Pattee - 'Bill' Baldwin
Mario Majeroni - The Opera Impresario
Phil Sandford - The Dance Hall Proprietor
Ethel Dayton - Sylvia Blaisdell
Ned Finlay - The Miner

See also
Ethel Barrymore on stage, screen and radio

References

External links

1917 films
American silent feature films
1917 drama films
Silent American drama films
American black-and-white films
Films directed by George D. Baker
Metro Pictures films
1910s American films